The Daylight Inn is a Grade II listed public house at Station Square, Petts Wood, Orpington, in the London Borough of Bromley.

It was built in 1935 for Charrington's Brewery, and designed by their chief architect Sidney Clark.

The pub was named in honour of William Willett who came up with the idea of Daylight Saving and lived in Petts Wood.  Long-standing legal restrictions meant that no other pub could be built within one mile. Until Wetherspoons opened The Sovereign of the Seas, Petts Wood only ever had one public house.

Conservation
The pub has undergone several refurbishments over the years, the most notable being in 1996, when the two sides of the pub (saloon bar and restaurant) were knocked into one.

It was Grade II listed in 2015 by Historic England as part of a drive to protect some of the country's best interwar pubs. The citation draws attention to the quality of the building including its plasterwork and structural timber framing.

References

Pubs in the London Borough of Bromley
Grade II listed pubs in London
Grade II listed buildings in the London Borough of Bromley
Timber framed buildings in London
Timber framed pubs in England
Tudor Revival pubs